Quarrier may refer to:
A worker in a quarry
Quarrier, West Virginia
Quarriers
William Quarrier

See also
Quarrier's Village